The Port Macquarie Sharks are an Australian rugby league football team based in Port Macquarie and was formed in 1940.

Playing Record 
Playing record compiled from scores published in the Rugby League Week.

See also

References

External links

Rugby league teams in New South Wales
Rugby clubs established in 1940
1940 establishments in Australia
Port Macquarie